Buschrodt is a village in the commune of Wahl, in western Luxembourg.  , the village had a population of 112.

Redange (canton)
Villages in Luxembourg